Caerphilly is a town and community in Wales. It is situated at the southern end of the Rhymney Valley.

It is the largest town in Caerphilly County Borough, and lies within the historic borders of Glamorgan, on the border with Monmouthshire. At the 2011 Census, the town had a population of 41,402 while the wider Caerphilly local authority area had a population of 178,806.

Toponym
The name of the town in Welsh, means "the fort of Ffili". Despite lack of evidence, tradition states that a monastery was built by St Cenydd, a sixth-century Christian hermit from the Gower Peninsula, in the area. The Welsh cantref in the medieval period was known as Senghenydd. It is said that St Cenydd's son, St Ffili, built a fort in the area, giving the town its name. An alternative explanation is that the town was named after the Anglo-Norman Marcher Lord, Philip de Braose.

History 
The town's site has long been of strategic significance. Around AD 75 a fort was built by the Romans during their conquest of Britain. An excavation of the site in 1963 showed that the fort was occupied by Roman forces until the middle of the second century.

Following the Norman invasion of Wales in the late 11th century, the area of Sengenhydd remained in Welsh hands. By the middle of the 12th century, the area was under the control of the Welsh chieftain Ifor Bach (Ifor ap Meurig). His grandson Gruffydd ap Rhys was the final Welsh lord of Sengenhydd, falling to the English nobleman Gilbert de Clare, the Red Earl, in 1266. In 1267 Henry III was forced to recognise Llywelyn ap Gruffudd as Prince of Wales, and by September 1268 Llywelyn had secured northern Sengenhydd. Gilbert de Clare had already begun to take steps to consolidate his own territorial gains, beginning the construction of Caerphilly Castle on 11 April 1268. The castle would also act as a buffer against Llewelyn's own territorial ambitions and was attacked by the Prince of Wales' forces before construction was halted in 1270. Construction recommenced in 1271 and was continued under the Red Earl's son, Gilbert de Clare, 8th Earl of Gloucester. With only interior remodelling carried out to the castle by Hugh le Despenser in the 1320s, Caerphilly Castle remains a pure example of 13th century military architecture and is the largest castle in Wales, and the second largest in Britain (after Windsor).

The original town of Caerphilly grew up as a small settlement raised just south of the castle by De Clare. After the death of Gilbert de Clare at the battle of Bannockburn in 1314, Edward II became guardian of De Clare's three sisters and heiresses. In 1315 he replaced de Badlesmere with a new English administrator, Payn de Turberville of Coity, who persecuted the people of Glamorgan. Then, like many in northern Europe at the time, the region was in the throes of a serious famine. In coming to the defence of his people, Llywelyn Bren, the great-grandson of Ifor Bach and Welsh Lord of Senghenydd incurred the wrath of de Turberville, who charged him with sedition. Llywelyn appealed to Edward II to call off or control his self-interested agent, but Edward ordered Llywelyn to appear before Parliament to face the charge of treason. The King promised Llywelyn that if the charges were found true, he would be hanged. Llywelyn fled and prepared for war. On 28 January 1316, Llywelyn began the revolt with a surprise attack on Caerphilly Castle. He captured the constable outside the castle and the outer ward, but could not break into the inner defences. His forces burned the town, slaughtered some of its inhabitants and started a siege. The town was rebuilt but remained very small throughout the Middle Ages. The first evidence of its emerging importance was the construction of a court house in the 14th century, the only pre-19th century building apart from the castle that remains in the town.

At the beginning of the 15th century the castle was again attacked, this time by Owain Glyndŵr, who took control of it around 1403–05. Repairs to the castle continued until at least 1430, but just a century later the antiquary John Leland recorded that the castle was a ruin set in marshland, with a single tower being used as a prison. In the mid-16th century the 2nd Earl of Pembroke used the castle as a manorial court, but in 1583 the castle was leased to Thomas Lewis, who accelerated its dilapidation by removing stonework to build his nearby manor, the Van. The Lewis family, who claimed descent from Ifor Bach, left the manor in the mid-18th century when they purchased St Fagans Castle, the Van falling into decay.

During the 1700s, Caerphilly began to grow into a market town. During the 19th century, as the South Wales Valleys underwent massive growth through industrialisation, so too the town's population grew. Caerphilly railway station was opened in 1871, and in 1899 the Rhymney Railway built their Caerphilly railway works maintenance facilities; however, the expansion of the population in the 19th century was more to do with the increasing market for coal.

Caerphilly is separated from the Cardiff suburbs of Lisvane and Rhiwbina by Caerphilly mountain. The town is known outside Wales for Caerphilly cheese.

Governance

There are two tiers of local government covering Caerphilly: Caerphilly Town Council at community level and Caerphilly County Borough Council at borough level. The town council is based at the Twyn Community Centre. The borough is named after Caerphilly, but covers a much larger area. The county borough council's main offices are not in the town of Caerphilly itself, but in the more central location of Ystrad Mynach.

Historically, Caerphilly formed part of the ancient parish of Eglwysilan in the county of Glamorgan. A local board was established to provide local government for Caerphilly in 1893, covering the two parishes of Eglwysilan and Llanfabon. The district covered by the board included a substantial area to the west and north-west of the town itself, extending to Taff's Well, Nelson and the southern part of Ystrad Mynach. In 1894, local boards were reconstituted as urban districts.

Caerphilly Urban District Council governed the area from 1894 until 1974. It established its headquarters at a converted house called Bron Rhiw on Mountain Road. The urban district was abolished in 1974, with the majority of the area becoming part of Rhymney Valley District in the new county of Mid Glamorgan, except for the Taff's Well ward which went instead to Taff-Ely. A Caerphilly community was established at the same time, being a lower-tier authority, initially covering that part of the former urban district within Rhymney Valley. The community was divided in 1985, with separate communities being created for Aber Valley, Llanbradach, Nelson, and Penyhreol, and transferring the part of Ystrad Mynach which had been in the Caerphilly community to the Gelligaer community. This left the reduced Caerphilly community just covering the town itself. Further local government reorganisation in 1996 saw the abolition of Mid Glamorgan County Council, and Rhymney Valley merged with neighbouring Islwyn borough to become the Caerphilly County Borough.

Culture 
Caerphilly is featured in the Sex Pistols documentary The Filth and the Fury. Protests and a prayer meeting were held outside the Castle Cinema on the evening of 14 December 1976, when the Pistols were playing a concert there. However, at this point in time, Caerphilly was one of the few councils that would allow the group to perform (Leeds and Manchester being the others). Caerphilly Castle was used as a filming location for Merlin and the Doctor Who episodes The Rebel Flesh and The Almost People (2011).

Caerphilly hosted the National Eisteddfod in 1950.

There are a number of notable figures who grew up in Caerphilly. They include comedian Tommy Cooper and the footballers David Pipe, Aaron Ramsey and Robert Earnshaw, whose family relocated to the town from Zambia.

The town has a rugby union club, Caerphilly RFC, who play in League Two East Central of the WRU National League.

The town has hosted two food fairs, the Caerphilly Food Festival, which is held on the streets of the town, and the Big Cheese Festival, which has been held in and around Caerphilly Castle every summer since 1998. Visitor numbers reached 80,000 in 2012. The event includes a wide variety of cheese stalls as well as a funfair, fireworks and a cheese race around the castle.

Caerphilly hosts a fundraising musical event called Megaday. In the Winter there is also the Festival of Light, which involves the procession of hundreds of lanterns through the centre of the town.

In 2012 Caerphilly County's only art gallery, Y Galeri, opened in St Fagan's Street in the town centre. It was part of plans to build a wider arts centre with exhibitions, workshops and talks.

In 2015, Caerphilly-born writer Thomas Morris published a short story collection, We Don't Know What We're Doing, which is set in Caerphilly. The book won the 2016 Wales Book of the Year and a Somerset Maugham Award.

Caerphilly Heart Disease Study 
The Caerphilly Heart Disease Study (also known as the Caerphilly Prospective Study) is one of the world's longest running epidemiology studies. Since 1979, a representative sample of adult males born between 1918 and 1938, living in Caerphilly and the surrounding villages of Abertridwr, Bedwas, Machen, Senghenydd and Trethomas, have participated in the study.  A wide range of health and lifestyle data have been collected throughout the study and have been the basis for over 400 publications in the medical press.  A notable report was on the reductions in vascular disease, diabetes, cognitive impairment and dementia attributable to a healthy lifestyle.

Transport

Aviation

Rail

Caerphilly has three railway stations. All are located on the Rhymney Line serving Cardiff.

 Caerphilly at the southern end of the town near the shopping area
 Aber in the western part of the town
 Energlyn & Churchill Park railway station in the far western part of the town

The rail service between Caerphilly and Cardiff Queen Street typically takes 13 minutes. From there services continue to Penarth, Cardiff Central, or on occasion Bridgend (Via Rhoose Cardiff International Airport).

Road

The A469 trunk road runs through the town north to south and connects the north to the Heads of the Valleys Road and the South to the A48 Cabalfa Interchange. The A468 skirts the northern boundary of the town connecting the west with the A470 and the east with the M4 Motorway European route E30 at junction 28.

Bus

Caerphilly has a wide variety of bus services all stopping at Caerphilly Interchange which is integrated with rail services at Caerphilly Railway Station. Services are operated by Stagecoach, Harris Coaches and on Sundays and public holidays by New Adventure Travel.

Almost all services to Cardiff, Newport, Blackwood, Pontypridd, Ystrad Mynach and Bargoed are operated by Stagecoach. There are also many local services to Senghenydd, Bedwas, and Llanbradach. A community bus service called Connect2 is also operated by Caerphilly Council which serves Mornigton Meadows, Bryncenydd and Glenfeilds Estate.

Traditional buses

Caerphilly Urban District Council (UDC) had its own fleet of buses, which began operating in 1920 although powers to operate them had been obtained by the UDC in 1917. In 1974, this fleet was amalgamated with those of Bedwas and Machen UDC and of Gelligaer UDC to create the bus fleet of Rhymney Valley District Council. The fleet persists today as a heritage operation.

Metro

The South Wales Metro is a system integrating heavy rail, light rail and bus services in South East Wales around the hub of Cardiff Central. The first phase was approved for development in October 2013. Work has already began and the Core Valley lines (including Rhymney line) are to be electrified. New trains will be introduced (British Rail Class 756), Increasing capacity, more frequent services and greener transport for the town and the local region. Caerphilly will also benefit from new greener buses which will also be integrated into the system. The Metro should be completed by late 2023 early 2024.

Notable people 

See also :Category:People from Caerphilly
 The pop-punk band Attack! Attack! were formed in Caerphilly.
 Norrie Alden (1909–1980), footballer
 Donald Braithwaite (1936–2017), former professional boxer, Bronze medalist at the 1958 British Empire and Commonwealth Games
 Margaret Bevan (born c.1894), girl evangelist
 Manon Carpenter (born 1993), mountain bike world champion
 Tommy Cooper (1921–1984), comedian and magician; he has a commemorative statue in the Twyn area
 Daniel and Laura Curtis, composers
 Amy Dowden (born 1990), professional dancer.
 Sian Evans (born 1971), singer-songwriter of the band Kosheen
 Sam Fenwick (born 1992), squash player
 Matt Johnson (born 1982), TV presenter
 Aaron Ramsey (born 1990), professional footballer
 Craig Roberts (born 1991), actor and director from Maesycwmmer, Caerphilly
 Eirlys Roberts (1911–2008), consumer advocate and campaigner
 Malcolm Uphill (1935–1999), professional motorcycle racer
 Leona Vaughan (born 1995), actress

References

Bibliography

External links 

 
 The Caerphilly Woodlands Trust
 Geograph- Photos of Caerphilly and surrounding area
 Caerphilly Observer Local news website

 
Towns in Caerphilly County Borough
Communities in Caerphilly County Borough